Haplochromis annectidens is a species of cichlid endemic to Lake Nabugabo in Uganda.  This species reaches a length of  SL.

References

annectidens
Endemic freshwater fish of Uganda
Fish described in 1933
Lake fish of Africa
Taxonomy articles created by Polbot